Béla Kenéz (20 December 1922 – 31 March 1994) was a Hungarian wrestler. He competed in the men's Greco-Roman flyweight at the 1952 Summer Olympics.

References

External links
 

1922 births
1994 deaths
Hungarian male sport wrestlers
Olympic wrestlers of Hungary
Wrestlers at the 1952 Summer Olympics
People from Cegléd
Sportspeople from Pest County